Alkabo School, in Alkabo, North Dakota, was listed on the National Register of Historic Places on December 7, 2010 with registration number 10000997.  It is located at the north end of Main St. in Alkabo. The school was built in 1934 by the William Nordman Company of Noonan. It was designed by architect Edwin W. Molander using the Italian Renaissance Revival and Colonial Revival styles. The school closed in 1963.

Minnesota politician Martin Sabo attended the school.

Alkabo has few residents and has largely been abandoned.  It is in the northwestern corner of the state.

References

External links

School buildings on the National Register of Historic Places in North Dakota
Italian Renaissance Revival architecture in the United States
Colonial Revival architecture in North Dakota
School buildings completed in 1934
Defunct schools in North Dakota
National Register of Historic Places in Divide County, North Dakota
1934 establishments in North Dakota
Renaissance Revival architecture in North Dakota